Frondihabitans peucedani is a Gram-positive and aerobic bacterium from the genus Frondihabitans which has been isolated from rhizosphere soil of the plant Peucedanum japonicum from the Mara Island in Korea.

References

Microbacteriaceae
Bacteria described in 2010